Vannadasan, aka Kalyanji is a Tamil writer from India. He was born as Siva Kalyana Sundaram in Tirunelveli in 1946, where he currently resides.. He is a son of Thi. Ka. Sivasankaran, a renowned Tamil writer. He writes short stories and non fiction articles under the pseudonym of Vannadhasan and poems under Kalyanji. He won the Sahitya Akademi Award for Tamil in 2016 for his short story collection Oru Siru Isai. He is also a recipient of Vishnupuram Literary Award, which he also won in 2016.
He is a retired bank employee.

List of books
 சிறுகதைத் தொகுப்புகள்: (Short stories)
 kalaikka Mudiyaatha Oppanaigal - கலைக்க முடியாத ஒப்பனைகள்-1976
Thottathukku veliyilum sila pookkal - தோட்டத்துக்கு வெளியிலும் சில பூக்கள்-1978
Samaveli - சமவெளி-1983
Peyar Theriyamal oru paravai - பெயர் தெரியாமல் ஒரு பறவை-1985
Manusha Manusha - மனுஷா மனுஷா-1990
Kanivu - கனிவு-1992
Nadugai - நடுகை-1996
Uyara parathal - உயரப் பறத்தல்-1998
Krishnan Vaitha veedu - கிருஷ்ணன் வைத்த வீடு-2000
Oliyile Therivadhu - ஒளியிலே தெரிவது-2010
Oru Siru Isai - ஒரு சிறு இசை-2013
Naabi kamalam -நாபிக்கமலம் -2015

Some of his poems are translated by Jayanthasri Balakrishnan in English in her blog, though not published.

Articles
 Agam Puram in Anandha Viktan.

See also
 List of Indian writers

References

Tamil-language writers
Living people
1946 births
Indian Tamil people
People from Tirunelveli
Writers from Tamil Nadu
Recipients of the Sahitya Akademi Award in Tamil
21st-century Indian short story writers